Canticles of Ecstasy is an album of sacred vocal music written in the 12th century by the German abbess Hildegard of Bingen and recorded by the early music ensemble Sequentia that was released by the Deutsche Harmonia Mundi recording label in 1993.

The album is one of a series of recordings of the complete musical works of Hildegard by the early medieval music specialists and founders of Sequentia, Barbara Thornton and her husband Benjamin Bagby.

It was recorded between 16 and 21 June 1993 in the church of St. Pantaleon, Cologne, Germany, "at the sarcophagus of the Empress Theophanu (d. 990)".

The music is from a medieval manuscript written at Hildegard's abbey (Rupertsberger "Riesencodex" (1180–90) Wiesbaden: Hessische Landesbibliothek, MS 2) and the Latin texts are from Hildegard von Bingen, Lieder (Salzburg, 1969).

Track listing
All vocal compositions (responses and antiphons) written by Hildegard of Bingen.
"O vis aeternitatis" (7:56)
"Nunc aperuit nobis" (1:53)
"Quia ergo femina mortem instruxit" (1:49)
"Cum processit factura digiti Dei" (6:32)
"Alma Redemptoris Mater" (2:10)
"Ave Maria, O auctrix vite" (8:57)
"Spiritus Sanctus vivificans vite" (2:15)
"O ignis spiritus Paracliti" (6:17)
"Caritas habundat in omnia" (2:10)
"O virga mediatrix" (2:25)
"O viridissima virga, Ave" (3:51)
Instrumental Piece (3:30)
"O Pastor Animarum" (1:18)
"O tu suavissima virga" (11:12)
"O choruscans stellarum" (2:37)
"O nobilissima viriditas" (6:42)

Personnel

Musicians
Barbara Thornton – voice, director
Gundula Anders – voice
Pamela Dellal – voice
Elizabeth Glen – voice
Heather Knutson – voice
Laurie Monahan – voice
Susanne Norin – voice
Janet Youngdahl – voice
Elizabeth Gaver – medieval fiddle, arranger
Elisabetta de Mircovich – medieval fiddle
Benjamin Bagby – medieval harp, arranger

Recording and production personnel
Jan Hofermann – executive producer
Klaus L. Neumann – producer
Barbara Valentin – artistic recording supervisor
Martin Andrae – technical recording supervisor
Barbara Göbel – editing
Jens Markowsky – final editing

See also

Ordo Virtutum

References

Western plainchant
Early music albums
1993 albums
Hildegard of Bingen